Erann David Drori (born in Copenhagen, Denmark on 7 September 1967), better known as Erann DD, is a Danish singer and songwriter of Yemeni-Jewish origin.

As a 12-year-old, Erann was sent to a religious school in Israel for three years. After dropping out of high school, he started singing in a funk band Zapp Zapp in the early 1990s. From 1995 to 1996, he released two albums with the duo Drori-Hansen Furniture made up of Erann on vocals and Casper Hansen on bass guitar.

Erann debuted as a solo artist with the double platinum-selling album Still Believing in 2000, which sold more than 125,000 copies. In 2001 he was nominated for 5 Danish Music Awards and won the one for the Best New Danish Act". In 2001 he sang a duet with Karen Busck called "Hjertet ser" from Buscks album of the same name. In 2003 the Erann album That's the Way for Me was picked at the Folkegaven 2004 for writing the song "When You Hold Me" dedicated to the wedding of Frederik, Crown Prince of Denmark and Princess Mary, the Crown Princess on 14 May 2004. The song debuted at number one on airplay list, and upon commercial release also hit No. 1 on the Danish Singles Chart.

On 28 August 2006, Erann DD released his third album, called Erann, and on 26 October 2009 his fourth album, Byen kalder being his first album in Danish.

In May 2011, he released the single "Fell in Love" on Eranns own company, Fox Off Production. The song was written in collaboration with Nik & Jay, and produced by house producer team Deeper People. "Fell in Love" was the first single from Erann's fifth studio album produced by Jon & Jules. 

Erann voiced Felix in the Danish dub of the 2021 Disney film Encanto.

Erann DD is married to designer Lizette Mikkelsen, with whom he has children Samuel, Leah and Ella.

Discography

Albums
in Zapp Zapp
1992: What Does Fish Is...?
1993: You Better Believe
in Drori-Hansen Furniture
1995: For Their Friends
1996: Family
as Erann DD (solo)

Live albums
2000: Live

Compilation albums

Singles

References

External links
Official website
Discogs

Danish male singers
Danish songwriters
1967 births
Living people
Musicians from Copenhagen
Jewish Danish musicians
Danish people of Yemeni-Jewish descent